Boztepe is a town and district of Kırşehir Province in the Central Anatolia region of Turkey. According to 2000 census, population of the district is 10,189 of which 5,022 live in the town of Boztepe.

Notes

References

External links
 District governor's official website 
 District municipality's official website 

Towns in Turkey
Populated places in Kırşehir Province
Districts of Kırşehir Province